The Mortal Coil is the debut studio album by Australian metalcore band Polaris. It was released on 3 November 2017 under Resist Records and SharpTone Records and has been nominated for an ARIA Award for Best Hard Rock or Heavy Metal Album, and  Australian Album of the Year award at the 2018 J Awards.

Release
On July 7, 2017, Polaris released the single "Consume", the first single off the album. Two more singles were released for the album, "The Remedy" on August 28, 2017, and "Lucid" on October 30, 2017.

Reception
Kill Your Stereo said that "Polaris are the next big thing", and applauded the technical aspects of the album, saying "The guitar work moves from these moments of groovy, nu-metal bounces (‘The Remedy'), to these mighty fine melodic touches ('In Somnus Veritas'), to these Periphery-esque tech sections (‘Relapse’)".

Track listing

Charts

Awards

ARIA Music Awards
The ARIA Music Awards is an annual awards ceremony that recognises excellence, innovation, and achievement across all genres of Australian music. 

|-
| 2018
| The Mortal Coil
| Best Hard Rock/Heavy Metal Album
| 
|-

J Award
The J Awards are an annual series of Australian music awards that were established by the Australian Broadcasting Corporation's youth-focused radio station Triple J. They commenced in 2005.

|-
| J Awards of 2018
| The Mortal Coil
| Australian Album of the Year
|

Personnel
Polaris
 Daniel Furnari – drums
 Jamie Hails – unclean vocals, clean vocals track 7
 Rick Schneider – rhythm guitar 
 Jake Steinhauser – bass, clean vocals 
 Ryan Siew – lead guitar

Production
 Grant McFarland – mastering, mixing, production, engineering
 Carson Slovak – mastering, mixing, production, engineering
 Ash Hull - management
 Chris Blancado - recording
 Carol Aldrighi - artwork, design

References

2017 debut albums
Polaris (Australian band) albums
Resist Records albums